A film is a thin layer of coating, skin.

Historically, photographic film is a thin medium conveyed with photographic images. 

In the case of moving images, the term "film" is also used for the images themselves, also called a motion picture or movie, independent of storage medium.

Film or Films may also refer to:

Materials

 Film stock, the medium used for motion picture photography
 Photographic film, medium used to capture pictures with a camera, also X-ray film for radiography
 Microfilm, a kind of microform for archive storage
 Biological membrane, a thin layer in living organisms
 Biofilm, a group of microorganisms in which cells stick to each other on a surface
 Thin film, a layer of material ranging from fractions of a nanometer to several micrometers
 Thick-film technology for electronic components, besides thin-film
 Coating, a thin chemical covering
 Plastic film, thin plastic used in packaging and other industries
 Window film, thin plastic coating for filtering and other uses
 Paint protection film, protective coating
 Soap film, a thin layer of liquid surrounded by air

Arts
 The Film, a Bollywood film by Junaid Memon
 Film (film), a 1965 film written by Samuel Beckett
 Film (band), a Croatian music group
 "Film", a bop by P-MODEL from the album Potpourri
 "Films", a song by Gary Numan from the album The Pleasure Principle
 The Films, an American rock band

Film review
 Film (Iranian magazine), a film review magazine
 Film (Polish magazine), a film review magazine
 /Film (pronounced "slashfilm"), a film news and review blog
 Film... (TV programme), a BBC film review show that is renamed annually

Business
 Film industry

Verb
 to film: to coat a surface
 to film: to record a motion picture